Al-Mouwasat University Hospital was founded on 1958 in Damascus, Syria. It is mainly composed of 4 buildings; Administration Building, Emergency And Out-Patient Clinics Building and the Physician Residence Building, alongside those building there is the Cardiovascular Surgery Building. The hospital's working team consists of 1700 Doctors and 3.500 Nurses.

The hospital contains 820 beds distributed into the following medical sections and devices:

Specialized and general surgery section:
General Surgery
Orthopedic Surgery
Neurosurgery
Vascular Surgery
Thoracic Surgery
Urosurgery
Burns and Plastic Surgery

Specialized and general internal medicine section:
Gastro Intestinal
Thoracic
Cardiology
Arthritis
Infectious Diseases
Neurology
Endocrinology
Kidney
Hematology
Psychology
Physiotherapy

Radiology /  X-ray section:
CT Scan Unit
X-ray Unit
MRI Unit
Mamo-graph Unit
Echo Unit
Emergency X-ray Unit

Otic section:
Ear Diseases and Cranial Base Surgery Unit
Nose and Sinus Diseases Surgery (including endoscopic)
Throat, Face, and Neck Diseases Surgery (including tumors)

Ophthalmology:
Glaucoma Unit
Retina and Vitreous Unit
Orbital Cavity
Cataract Clinic

Laboratories

Intensive care unit

Specialized outpatient clinics

Central emergency

See also
 Faculty of Medicine of Damascus University

References

Hospital buildings completed in 1958
Hospitals in Syria
Medical education in Syria
Teaching hospitals
Hospitals established in 1958
1958 establishments in Syria
Damascus University
Buildings and structures in Damascus